The Cililitan- Tanjung Priok Road (Indonesian: Jalan Raya Cililitan-Tanjung Priok) or the Jakarta Bypass or Djakarta Bypass/Bypass is a 27 km (17 mile) long bypass road in the capital city of Indonesia, Jakarta, that connects the Dewi Sartika Road and the Bogor Main Road (Jalan Raya Bogor, which is one of the sections of the Great Post Road/Jalan Raya Pos) in Cililitan, East Jakarta to the Port of Tanjung Priok in North Jakarta. This bypass road is divided into four parts, Jalan Mayjen Sutoyo Road, Jalan  D.I. Panjaitan, Jalan Jend. Ahmad Yani Road, and Jalan Laksamana Yos Sudarso. The bypass was inaugurated by the first President of Indonesia, Sukarno on October 21, 1963. One of the sectionsof the Jakarta Inner Ring Road is built above this road.

The purpose of this road was to expoedite travel from Tanjung Priok to the centre of Jakarta. It was the benchmark of the city's development in the east. It had an important role for creating the west–east axis roads of the city that had been dominated by north–south axis roads.

History

Background 
The construction of the Jakarta Bypass was one of the plans created by Sukarno, the first Indonesian President to redevelop Jakarta as a "beacon" of a powerful new nation of Indonesia, These plans were part of Jakarta's preparations for the 1962 Asian Games.

The 1962 Asian Games preparation also involved diplomatic relationships with the Soviet Union and Japan, where the Soviets helped with the construction of the Gelora Bung Karno Main Stadium and the Japanese helped with the construction of Hotel Indonesia as the accommodation for invited guests during the Games. After the Soviet Union and Japan, the Indonesian Government asked the United States for assistance with the construction of the Asian Games infrastructure.

At that time, the diplomatic relationship between Indonesia and the US was less harmonious, due to the accusations that the US had provided assistance to the Revolutionary Government of the Republic of Indonesia (Pemerintahan Revolusioner Republik Indonesia (PRRI)), which opposed the central government of Indonesia. The accusations were based on the capture of Allen Pope, the American pilot of an B-26 aircraft that had carried out an attack in Maluku in 1958.

Eventually, the Indonesian government agreed to release Allen Pope after negotiating with the US. During the negotiations, the US government offered aid to build a 27 km length highway connecting the port of Tanjung Priok, Halim Perdanakusuma International Airport, and the regions of Cililitan and Cawang. This proposed highway became the first stage of the Jakarta Bypass.

Construction 
The Construction was started in the early 1960s and finished in late 1963. During the construction, the Jakarta Bypass was used as the route for vehicles carrying materialsfor the construction of the Gelora Bung Karno Main Stadium from the port of Tanjung Priok. In 1962, the bypass was used as the track for the marathon and cycling races during the 1962 Asian Games.

Inauguration 
The inauguration ceremony of the Jakarta Bypass was held on October 21, 1963. The inauguration was attended by the first President of Indonesia; Sukarno, the US ambassador for Indonesia; Howard P. Jones, the Governor of Jakarta; Soemarno Sosroatmodjo, the representatives of several countries, and the people of Jakarta. At that time, Sukarno gave a speech before he inaugurated the road. After that, Sukarno cut the ribbon of the inauguration of Jakarta Bypass and inspected the new highway.

Parts 
The Jakarta Bypass is divided into four parts. Three of them are named after the people killed by the presidential guard in the 1965 coup attempt. These are:

 Jalan Mayjen Sutoyo, from Cililitan junction to Cawang.
 Jalan D.I. Panjaitan, from Cawang junction to the Jatinegara overpass.
 Jalan Jenderal Ahmad Yani , from Jatinegara overpass to the Kelapa Gading junction.
 Jalan Yos Sudarso Road, from Kelapa Gading junction to the port of Tanjung Priok.

Administratively, this road passes the regions of:

 East Jakarta Administrative City
 Kramat Jati district
 Cililitan Sub-district
 Cawang Sub-district
 Jatinegara district
 Bidara Cina Sub- district
 Cipinang Cependak Sub- district
 Rawa Bunga Sub-district
 Bali Mester Sub-district
 Matraman district
 Pisangan Baru Sub-district
 Kayu Manis Sub-district
 Utan Kayu Selatan Sub- district
 Utan Kayu Utara Sub-district
 Pulo Gadung district
 Pisangan Timur Sub-district
 RawamangunSub- district
 Kayu Putih Sub-district
 Central Jakarta Administrative City
 Cempaka Putih District
 Rawasari Sub- district
 Cempaka Putih Sub- district
 Kemayoran District
 Sumur Batu Sub-district
 North Jakarta Administrative City
 Kelapa Gading district
 Kelapa Gading Barat Sub-district
 Koja District
 Rawa Badak Selatan Sub-district
 Rawa Badak Utara Sub-district
 Tanjung Priok District
 Sunter Jaya Sub-district
 Sungai Bambu Sub-district
 Kebon Bawang Sub-district

Transportation

Bus routes 
The Jakarta Bypass is part of Transjakarta Corridor 10. Other bus services like the APTB, Mayasari Bakti, MetroMini, and PPD are also use the Jakarta Bypass.

Toll roads 

The  Wiyoto Wiyono Elevated Toll  Road is built above the bypass. The toll road has a length of 15 km from the Jagorawi Toll Road to the port of Tanjung Priok. The Ir. Wiyoto Wiyono Toll Road is one of the parts of the Jakarta Inner Ring Road network.

The Bekasi–Cawang–Kampung Melayu Toll Road from the Kampung Melayu/Basuki Rahmat junction towards west to the city of Bekasi, West Java is also part of the Bypass

References 

Streets in Jakarta